Sukhamoy Sen Gupta (September 1919 – c. 2003), also known as Sukhamoy Sengupta, was an Indian politician. He was the Chief Minister of Tripura in India as a member of the Indian National Congress.

References

1919 births
2000s deaths
University of Calcutta alumni
Chief Ministers of Tripura
Bengali Hindus
Chief ministers from Indian National Congress
Tripura MLAs 1972–1977
Indian National Congress politicians
Tripura politicians